Tapinoma minutum is a species of ant in the genus Tapinoma. Described by Gustav Mayr in 1862, the species is endemic to Australia and surrounding countries.

References

Tapinoma
Hymenoptera of Australia
Insects described in 1862